James Bryce may refer to:

James Bryce (geologist) (1806–1877), Irish naturalist and geologist
James Bryce (footballer) (1884–1916), Scottish footballer
James Bryce, 1st Viscount Bryce (1838–1922), British jurist, historian and politician
James W. Bryce (1880–1949), North American inventor and pioneer in magnetic data recording